The People's Movement of Ukraine is a Ukrainian political party and first opposition party in Soviet Ukraine. Often it is simply referred to as the Movement (Rukh). The party under the name Rukh was an observer member of the European People's Party (EPP) until 2013. It is considered to have played a key role in Ukraine regaining its independence in 1991.

Rukh gathers most of its voters and support from Western Ukraine. In November 2016, the party had 35,000 members.

History

Public movement

Initially organized as the People's Movement of Ukraine for Perestroika, Rukh was founded in September 6–8, 1989 as a civil-political movement as there were no other political parties allowed in the Soviet Union but the Communist Party. The founding of Rukh was made possible due to Soviet General Secretary Mikhail Gorbachev's Glasnost policies. The program and statutes of the movement were proposed by the Writers Association of Ukraine and were published in the journal Literary Ukraine (Literaturna Ukraina) on 16 February 1989. The organization has its roots in Ukrainian dissidents — the most notable of them being Viacheslav Chornovil — yet not excluding the fact that it was accepting various other politically oriented members from liberal communists to integralist nationalists. From March to September 1989 numerous constituent party conferences took place across Ukraine. The first Constituent Congress of the "People's Movement of Ukraine for Reconstruction" took place on 8–10 September 1989 in Kyiv. Elected as the first leader of the movement was the Ukrainian poet and screenwriter Ivan Drach.

Appearance of the organization coincided with dismissal of Volodymyr Shcherbytsky as the First Secretary of Central Committee of the Communist Party of Ukraine and rise of Leonid Kravchuk. On one hand Kravchuk officially promised that "faster he will grow hair on his palm than Rukh will be registered", on the other hand according to author of the book "People's Movement of Ukraine. History", Hryhoriy Honcharuk, with reference to Ivan Drach, it was Kravchuk who facilitated publishing of the Rukh's program draft in "Literaturna Ukrayina" in February 1989. And according to rumors, he also approved that the rector of KPI Talanchuk would grant the Politech's Assembly Hall to hold the Rukh's constituent congress.

The official Soviet press and government portrayed members as anti-Semites at first.

The movement's biggest public, political, cultural, and social actions were:
Human chain (1990) – a chain of volunteers that stretched around  all the way from the city of Lviv to the city of Kyiv, the capitals of the two former Ukrainian states that signed the Act Zluky (Unification act) on 22 January 1919. According to the Department of Internal Affairs (Ukrainian SSR) there were only 450,000 participants, while the organizers claimed that there were between four and five million.
Mass excursions (1990) – festivities near Nikopol and Zaporizhzhia to celebrate the 500th Anniversary of the Zaporozhian Cossacks from 7 September through 12.
Various activities near Berestechko, Baturyn, Lubny, and Khotyn.

At first the movement aimed at supporting Gorbachev's reforms, later the People's Movement of Ukraine was instrumental in conducting an independence referendum in the Ukrainian SSR. This was partially due to the Russification policies of the Soviet Union when the USSR Supreme Soviet officially announced the Russian language as the singular official state language of the country in 1989. During Rukh's existence within the Soviet Union, its members were threatened and intimidated. In the western oblasts "Rukh" became colloquially known as an abbreviation for the call Save Ukraine, fellows! (Рятуйте Україну, Хлопці!).

Political party
The movement initially registered by the Ministry of Justice on 9 February 1990 as the political party. After the creation of the Ukrainian Republican Party (URP) in January 1990 and later the Democratic Party of Ukraine (DemPU), the People's Movement of Ukraine unofficially existed as a coalition of those two along with numerous other smaller factions. These parties created a group within the Verkhovna Rada called the "Democratic Bloc" which stood in opposition to "Group 239", which was led by Oleksandr Moroz ("For the sovereign Soviet Ukraine") (see 1990 Ukrainian parliamentary election).

In the March 1990 Ukrainian local elections Rukh won majorities in the elections of the city councils of Lviv and Kiev and was successful in western Ukraine.

In October 1990 Rukh's second Party Congress took place. During the session it was decided to exclude the word "Reconstruction" (Perestroika), not to be associated with the Communist movement. Ivan Drach was re-elected as leader, while his deputies became Mykhailo Horyn and Oleksandr Lavrynovych. In order to draw the URP and DemPU closer to Rukh, the "Institute of Associative Membership in the Movement" was established. The brittle coalition of the mentioned parties held until the presidential elections in September 1991 when URP and DemPU provided their own candidates in opposition to Vyacheslav Chornovil.

From 28 February – 1 March 1992 the third Party Congress took place during which a schism within Rukh was avoided by electing a leadership triad of Ivan Drach, Mykhailo Horyn, and Vyacheslav Chornovil. The new deputy leaders were M. Boychyshyn, O. Burakovsky, V. Burlakov, and O. Lavrynovych. The "Institute of Associative Membership in the Movement" was formally recognized as dissolved due to both the URP and DemPU declaring themselves as supporters of state president Leonid Kravchuk. The People's Movement of Ukraine declared its parliamentary opposition to the government and in January 1992 re-registered due to substantial changes in its statutes. Soon Ivan Drach left the party, followed by the resignation of Mykhailo Horyn in June 1992 together with V. Burlakov. Horyn was soon elected as leader of the Ukrainian Republican Party. In December 1992 Rukh's IV Party Congress took place which once again revised its statute and the party's goals. Vyacheslav Chornovil was elected leader, the rest of the party's leadership was left without major changes. During the Congress some party delegates in opposition to Chornovil created the All-National Movement of Ukraine (VNRU), headed by Larysa Skoryk.

The People's Movement of Ukraine was registered by the Ukrainian Ministry of Justice as a political party on 1 February 1993. Rukh's parliamentary faction split up into 2 different factions in the spring of 1999 (the breakaway faction was led by Hennadiy Udovenko with its highest Rada membership of 19 dwindling to 14; the "other" faction ended with 23; meaning that 10 elected People's Movement of Ukraine deputies did not represent any segment of the party anymore by June 2002). Right before the 1999 presidential elections another major schism took place within the party. Yuriy Kostenko openly protested against the election of Viacheslav Chornovil as the party leader and established another party, People's Movement of Ukraine (Kostenko), where Kostenko became the leader of the party. Despite the split a followed party congress elected Vyacheslav Chornovil as party leader. The congress also adopted the signing of an agreement between People's Movement of Ukraine and the Reforms and Order Party for a political bloc supporting Hennadiy Udovenko as a single presidential candidate for the next elections. At the parliamentary elections on 29 March 1998, the party received 9.4% of the vote and 46 seats. At the parliamentary elections on 30 March 2002, the party was part of the Viktor Yushchenko Bloc–Our Ukraine. Currently, Rukh was a part of the Our Ukraine Bloc, where it represented the right wing of the Union's party spectrum. At the parliamentary elections on 26 March 2006, the party was part of the Our Ukraine alliance, and the party's members secured 13 seats in the parliament. At the 2007 parliamentary elections the party was again part of the Our Ukraine–People's Self-Defense Bloc alliance, that won 72 out of 450 seats.

In the 2010 local elections the party won 8 representative in the regional parliament of the Lviv Oblast, 3 representative in the regional parliament of Ivano-Frankivsk Oblast, 1 in Kherson Oblast, 5 in the Verkhovna Rada of Crimea and 3 seats in the city councils of Lviv and Simferopol.

The party competed as one single party under the "umbrella" party "Fatherland", together with several other parties, during the 2012 parliamentary elections During the election this list won 62 seats (25.55% of the votes) under the proportional party-list system and another 39 by winning 39 simple-majority constituencies; a total of 101 seats in Parliament. The party independently unsuccessfully participated in 2 constituencies.

In 2013, the party split in two parts. The party merged with Ukrainian People's Party in May 2013. While its former chairman Borys Tarasyuk and others assimilated into "Fatherland" in June 2013. The bulk of the party  organisation and ordinary members remained loyal to the party.

In the 2014 Ukrainian presidential election party leader Vasyl Kuybida received 0.06% of the vote.

In the 2014 Ukrainian parliamentary election the party participated in 3 constituencies; but its candidates lost in all of them and thus the party won no parliamentary seats. However, after being expelled from (the political party) Self Reliance the lawmakers Pavlo Kyshkar and Viktor Kryvenko joined the party in April 2016 (in parliament they both joined the faction of the Petro Poroshenko Bloc in March 2016 before leaving it in December 2017).

In the 2015 Ukrainian local elections the party was able to gain seats in 270 local councils (0.17% of all local councils).

On 10 January 2019 Viktor Kryvenko was chosen the People's Movement of Ukraine candidate in the 2019 Ukrainian presidential election and their chairman. In the election he received 0.04% of the vote.

In the 2019 Ukrainian parliamentary election the party had 18 candidates in constituencies, but none of them won a parliamentary seat.

In the 2020 Ukrainian local elections the party gained 209 deputies (0.47% of all available mandates).

Political platform

Directly out of the official website:
Further strengthening and development of the democratic roots of Ukrainian national statehood;
Implementing the ideas of democracy, pluralism, social solidarity, and open society;
Rebuilding the national economy on the principles of a freely competitive market system;
Facilitating the development of private entrepreneurship;
Systemic agrarian reform;
Ensuring social security for every citizen, social assistance for those in need;
Pension reform;
The cultural revival of Ukrainian society, of the Ukrainian people's national identity, of the Ukrainian language in all spheres of public life;
 Integration into the EU and NATO as a vital cornerstone of Ukraine's foreign policy.

Associated organizations
 Shevchenko Society of Ukrainian language
 Lion's Society
 Committee in support of Lithuania (1990)
 Qurultay of the Crimean Tatar People
 Students' Fraternity of Lviv
 Ukrainian Student League

Elections history

Notable politicians

Yuriy Kostenko, Minister of Natural Environment in 1992–1998
Volodymyr Lanovyi, Minister of Economy (Vice-Prime Minister) in 1991–1992
Borys Tarasyuk, Minister of Foreign Affairs in 1998–2000 and 2005–2007
Hennadiy Udovenko, Minister of Foreign Affairs in 1994–1998

Notes
 Temporarily merged with Batkivshchyna as Fatherland – United Opposition

See also
Qurultai-Rukh

References

External links
 
  Movement's history from the official website
 Rakhmanin, S. Rukh and the presidents: A story of amorous dragon (РУХ И ПРЕЗИДЕНТЫ: ИСТОРИЯ ВЛЮБЧИВОГО ДРАКОНА). Mirror Weekly. 10 September 1999. 

1989 establishments in Ukraine
Conservative parties in Ukraine
Liberal parties in Ukraine
Liberal conservative parties
Nationalist parties in Ukraine
Parliamentary factions in Ukraine
Political parties established in 1989
Pro-European political parties in Ukraine
Pro-independence parties in the Soviet Union